Anzalduas International Bridge is an international bridge over the Rio Grande, which connects the western outskirts of both the city of Mission, Texas in the United States and the city of Reynosa, Tamaulipas state, in Mexico. 

It provides cross-border commuters with two southbound and northbound lanes, as well as a pedestrian crossing. 

The bridge opened on December 15, 2009.

Bridge data  
 Constructed by: Williams Brothers Construction
 Ground broke June 12, 2007
 Opened for business on December 15, 2009
 Construction cost: $28,493,593.70
 Four entrance lanes, including a SENTRI Lane in the United States.
 Bridge spans 3.2 miles (5.1 km)
 Has two safety bump-out spaces, and a pedestrian walkway, with lanes elevated to preserve nearby U.S. Fish and Wildlife Refuge
 Hours of operation: 6 am to 10 pm, daily

Border crossing

The Anzalduas Port of Entry opened on December 15, 2009 with the completion of the Anzalduas International Bridge. It was designed to divert traffic from the congested Hidalgo Texas Port of Entry.

Commercial trucks and pedestrians continue to be prohibited from entering the US via this crossing; however, empty trucks may travel southbound to Mexico.  The bridge has a dedicated commuter lane (SENTRI) that is open on restricted hours and frequently open to the general public during high traffic hours without notice.

See also
 McAllen–Hidalgo–Reynosa International Bridge — next downriver between the cities.
 Pharr-Reynosa International Bridge — 2nd downriver between the cities, for trucks.

References 

International bridges in Tamaulipas
International bridges in Texas
Road bridges in Texas
Pedestrian bridges in Texas
Toll bridges in Mexico
Toll bridges in Texas
Reynosa
Bridges completed in 2009
Buildings and structures in Hidalgo County, Texas
Transportation in Hidalgo County, Texas
Transportation in McAllen, Texas
2009 establishments in Texas
2009 establishments in Mexico